The Kababaihan Gabay ng Bayan - KAGABAY, means "women supporting the country" in Filipino. KAGABAY is a non-government, non-profit, social development organization. It was set up to address poverty reduction through the social, political and economic empowerment of women in urban poor and resettlement communities. With its motto: “Kababaihan Para Sa Kababaihan" (ph.Women for Women), KAGABAY aims to contribute to the achievement of the country’s Millennium Development Goals through the empowerment of women that will enable them  to address the multi‐faceted dimensions of poverty within their communities.

History

The organisation was established in May 2007. The same year, the first St. Marie Eugenie Learning Center was  established in the coastal area of Tanza, Navotas.

In 2008, 7 more St. Marie Eugenie Learning Centers were set up in:
Abbey Road, Barangay Bagbag, Novaliches, Quezon City
Barangay 176, Bagong Silang, Caloocan
KarismaVille,Barangay Panghulo, Malabon
Barangay Kaypian, San Jose del Monte, Bulacan
Southville 1 Resettlement Site, Niugan, Cabuyao, Laguna
Southville 7 Resettlement Site I, Dayap, Calauan, Laguna
Green Valley, Barangay Molino 2, Bacoor, Cavite

In year 2009 
Balangay, Barangay Molino 2, Bacoor, Cavite

In year 2010
Southville 7 Resettlement Site III, Sto. Tomas, Calauan, Laguna

In year 2013
Oro Compound,Barangay Bagbag,Quezon City
Green Valley, Molino 3, Bacoor, Cavite

Initiative Programs
The Kagabay's framework for women empowerment revolves around 4K's: Kabuhayan (Livelihood), Kalusugan (Health), Kalikasan (Environment) and Katatagan (Empowerment). The mothers groups undergo training in:
 Livelihood - social entrepreneurship, micro finance, and local employment
 Health  - including sexual and reproductive health rights and Philhealth
 Environment - solid waste management, vegetable gardening, disaster preparedness and management
 ''Organizational development"  towards the formation and strengthening  of their local organization K-4 Network ( Katipunan ng Kababaihan Kabalikat sa Kaunlaran ), to coalesce into network of women’s organizations.

To achieve its goals, KAGABAY conducts following programs:
 Early Child Care and Development (ECCD)
 Women in Communities (WIC)
 Women in Grassroots Governance (WIG)

Women in Communities
The Women in Communities (WIC) is organizing and capability building program for women in resettlement areas. Under the WIC program, the organizing initiatives begin with the setting up of the St. Marie Eugenie Learning Center - pre-school for children aged 4–5 that also provides daily feeding to address the problem of malnutrition. The program includes organizing mothers' classes on 4 K,s Kabuhayan, Kalusugan,Kalikasan,Katatagan, and forming mothers’ community organization.

Women in Grassroots Governance
Women in Grassroots Governance (WIG) is women empowering program which involves not just rights-based training  but also increasing women's participation in local governance. In line with this objective, women have been organized into a federated, SEC-registered sectoral organization with a functional structure designed to implement plans and programs focused on the K-4 framework in their respective communities.

The WIG program also includes training of our  K-4 leaders in processes that will ensure active  participation in local special bodies at the barangay governance level.

The Barangay Governance Support Project, provides barangays with technical support in poverty mapping through the Community-Based Monitoring System (CBMS), and trains barangay officials, especially women officials, in the conduct of participatory Barangay Development Planning with particular emphasis on the inclusion of the women's agenda.

The Local Women Leadership project, identifies the women in KAGABAY communities and organizations who have the potential for public service; the program provides these potential leaders with training on running an electoral campaign, development of a campaign platform; and network with other elected barangay women for solidarity and the development of a common women’s agenda.

Special Concerns 

Working with women as a sector, inevitably brings in the related issues of other sectors, like the urban poor sector, the informal workers sector, children sector, youth and senior citizens sectors.

KAGABAY'S role is to facilitate and provide technical services to the various sectoral organizations and formations that seek to partner with KAGABAY in their engagements with government.

KAGABAY works with various agencies of government to facilitate the responses of these agencies towards the issues and concerns of the various sectors  through the inter-agency mechanism that is co-sponsored by the government agency involved.

Cooperation
KAGABAY's Agency Partners are:

National Government Agencies (NGAs)
National Housing Authority (NHA)
Presidential Commission on Urban Poor
Department of Agriculture
Peoples Credit and Finance Corporation
Department of Science and Technology
Department of Education (DepEd)
Commission on Filipinos Overseas
People's Credit and Finance Corporation
Office of the President
Local Government Units (LGUs)
City of Parañaque
Mayor Strike Revilla of the City Bacoor, Cavite
Mayor Oreta of Malabon
Mayor Berris of Calauan, Laguna
Non-Government Organisations (NGOs)
PHINMA 
Coffee Bean & Tea Leaf
Security Bank Foundation inc.
Nourish the Children Foundation
Miriam College
Approtech Asia / Engender Network
Assumption College Alumni Association
AIESEC
PhilSEN
LBC Foundation
Philippine Good Works Mission Foundation
Wadah Foundation

Supporting Kagabay
KAGABAY establishes partnerships with various national government agencies, local governments, non-government organizations, private and corporate donors, as well as the international donor community, to provide its services in the areas where it present.

KAGABAY also supports other marginalized sectors  such as the youth sector, the senior citizens sector, the urban poor, workers in the informal economy and the rest of the 14 Basic Sectors specified under Republic Act 8425, or the Social Reform law, also known as the NAPC law.

References

External links
http://www.facebook.com/pages/Kagabay
https://web.archive.org/web/20120326172447/http://cbmsphilippines.webs.com/
http://www.sec.gov.ph/
https://web.archive.org/web/20131118114600/http://paranaque.gov.ph/

Non-profit organizations based in the Philippines